Soufiane Chilah (born 26 October 1991) is a Belgian actor working in theatre, film and television.

After developing an interest in acting, Chilah studied performing arts at the Erasmus Brussels University of Applied Sciences and Arts and graduated from there. He began working in theatre appearing in productions from Belgium and France. He made his film debut in Black (2015), a crime film directed by Adil El Arbi and Bilall Fallah. His acting credits include Home (2016), Tabula Rasa (2017), The Team (2018), War of the Worlds (2019), Animals (2021), and Faithfully Yours (2022).

He received a Magritte Award for Most Promising Actor for his work in Blind Spot (2017).

Filmography

References

External links

1991 births
Belgian film actors
Belgian male stage actors
Belgian television actors
Living people
Magritte Award winners